Ach Brito & Ca., S.A. is a Portuguese company that manufactures soaps, bath salts and aromatic candles, among other cosmetic products. It is based in Fajozes, Vila do Conde.

History
Ach. Brito was founded by Ferdinand Claus and Georges Ph. Schweder, two Germans who had chosen to settle in Portugal. They started, in 1887, Claus & Schweder, the first national soap and perfume factory. The products were sold under the brand "FPC – Fábrica de Produtos Chimicos Claus & Schweder, Sucrs".

The soaps are made by manual milling them, then after drying, workers wrap them in colorful Art Deco wrapping.  Oprah Winfrey included them on her list of Oprah's Favorite Things in 2007, calling them "a labor of love".

See also
List of companies of Portugal

References

External links
  - Claus Porto
 Official website - Ach. Brito
 Claus Porto USA
 Catalog (only available for US or Canada)

Cosmetics companies of Portugal
Soap brands
Companies based in Porto
Manufacturing companies established in 1887
Portuguese brands
1887 establishments in Portugal